The Overholser Mansion is a mansion in Oklahoma City's Heritage Hills neighborhood built in 1903.

History
The mansion was built by Henry Overholser, considered to be the "father of Oklahoma City" by many, and his socialite wife Anna Overholser, and is considered to be Oklahoma City's first mansion. Overholser bought the land for the purpose of building a residence in 1901 and, when built, the mansion was located away from the city center and surrounded by farmland. Mr. Overholser died in 1915. The couple's daughter, Henry Ione Overholser (born in 1905), married David Perry in 1926 and lived in the mansion with Mrs. Overholser until her death in 1940. Mrs. Overholser transferred ownership to Henry lone in 1937. After Henry Ione's death in 1959, the property was transferred to her husband David Perry, who then sold the mansion and its furnishings to the Oklahoma Chapter of American Institute of Architects and Historical Preservation Inc. The mansion was later donated to the State of Oklahoma. The Oklahoma Historical Society managed the property from 1982 to 2003, and from 2003 to the present the site has been managed by Preservation Oklahoma. The Overholser Mansion was restored in 2015 and is open for tours.

The mansion was listed on the National Register of Historic Places in 1970.

Architecture
The 11,700 square-foot Châteauesque-styled mansion was designed by London-trained architect W. S. Matthews and built at a cost of $38,000. A carriage house accompanies the mansion and measures an additional 4,000 square feet. On the south facade, facing the Hales Mansion, is a porte-cochère. The mansion is constructed of brick and sandstone. Interior walls and ceilings were hand-painted and are illuminated by light fixtures imported from Italy. Original French stained-glass windows remain, and the floors are original English carpets and are accented by Belgian woodwork.

See also
National Register of Historic Places listings in Oklahoma County, Oklahoma

References

External links
 Official site

Museums in Oklahoma City
Historic house museums in Oklahoma
National Society of the Colonial Dames of America
Residential buildings in Oklahoma City
National Register of Historic Places in Oklahoma County, Oklahoma
Houses on the National Register of Historic Places in Oklahoma